Newton is a city in and the county seat of Harvey County, Kansas, United States. As of the 2020 census, the population of the city was 18,602. The city of North Newton is located immediately north and exists as a separate political entity. Newton is located at the intersection of Interstate 135, U.S. Route 50, and U.S. Route 81 highways.

History

19th century

For millennia, the land now known as Kansas was inhabited by Native Americans. In 1803, most of modern Kansas was secured by the United States as part of the Louisiana Purchase. In 1854, the Kansas Territory was organized, then in 1861 Kansas became the 34th U.S. state. In 1872, Harvey County was founded.

In 1871, the Atchison, Topeka and Santa Fe Railway extended a main line from Emporia westward to Newton by July 1871. The town soon became an important railroad shipping point of Texas cattle.

The city was founded in 1871 and named after Newton, Massachusetts, home of some of the Santa Fe stockholders.

In August 1871, there was a Gunfight at Hide Park, in which a total of eight men were killed. The incident began with an argument between two local lawmen, Billy Bailey and Mike McCluskie. Because of this incident, Newton became known as "bloody and lawless—the wickedest city in the west.".

In 1872, the western terminal for the Atchison, Topeka and Santa Fe Railway and the railhead for the Chisholm Trail were established here.  Shortly after incorporation of the city in 1872, the Newton city council passed an ordinance prohibiting the running at large of buffalo and other wild animals.

20th century

Newton served as the Middle Division dispatching headquarters for the "Santa Fe" until the mid-1980s, when all dispatching for the Chicago to Los Angeles system was centralized in the Chicago area. In 1995, the Santa Fe merged with the Burlington Northern Railroad, and is now known as the BNSF Railway. The BNSF continues to be a large industrial taxpayer although its impact as an employer has decreased in the past decade.  Most locals still refer to this railroad as the "Santa Fe".

21st century
On February 25, 2016, Newton was the site of the first of several related shooting incidents, which culminated in a mass shooting at an Excel Industries building in nearby Hesston that left three people dead and twelve others injured. The shooter, identified as Excel employee Cedric Larry Ford, was then killed by responding police officers.

Geography
Newton is located at coordinates 38.0466779, -97.3450365 in the state of Kansas.

The city is in the central portion of the continental United States. U.S. Highway 81, also known as the Meridian Highway, stretches from Winnipeg, Manitoba, Canada to Mexico City, Mexico through Central and South America. It passes through Newton, Kansas and is known as "Main Street." U.S. Highway 50 runs past the White House in Washington, DC through Newton, Kansas and continues on to Sacramento, California.

Climate
The climate in this area is characterized by hot, humid summers and generally mild to cool winters.  According to the Köppen Climate Classification system, Newton has a humid subtropical climate, abbreviated "Cfa" on climate maps.

Demographics

Newton is included in the Wichita metropolitan statistical area (MSA).  It is located in Harvey County which is an agricultural and small manufacturing county with 34,361 people. Harvey County Kansas is part of a 5 county Metro Area with 650,000 people, the largest anchored in the state of Kansas. The major city in this metro area is Wichita, Kansas, 20 miles (20 minutes) to the South via I-135.

2010 census
As of the census of 2010, there were 19,132 people, 7,584 households, and 5,045 families living in the city. The racial makeup of the city was 88.4% White, 2.2% African American, 0.9% Native American, 0.8% Asian, 4.7% from other races, and 2.9% from two or more races. Hispanic or Latino of any race were 16.3% of the population.

There were 7,584 households, of which 33.1% had children under the age of 18 living with them, 51.5% were married couples living together, 10.3% had a female householder with no husband present, 4.7% had a male householder with no wife present, and 33.5% were non-families. 29.1% of all households were made up of individuals, and 12.3% had someone living alone who was 65 years of age or older. The average household size was 2.46 and the average family size was 3.01.

The median age in the city was 36.8 years. 26.4% of residents were under the age of 18; 7.9% were between the ages of 18 and 24; 24.9% were from 25 to 44; 25% were from 45 to 64; and 15.9% were 65 years of age or older. The gender makeup of the city was 48.4% male and 51.6% female.

2000 census
As of the census of 2000, there were 17,190 people, 6,851 households, and 4,610 families living in the city. The racial makeup of the city was 86.73% White, 2.30% African American, 0.53% Native American, 0.66% Asian, 0.03% Pacific Islander, 6.84% from other races, and 2.92% from two or more races. Hispanic or Latino of any race were 12.73% of the population.

There were 6,851 households, out of which 31.9% had children under the age of 18 living with them, 54.2% were married couples living together, 9.6% had a female householder with no husband present, and 32.7% were non-families. 28.9% of all households were made up of individuals, and 12.1% had someone living alone who was 65 years of age or older. The average household size was 2.43 and the average family size was 2.99.

In the city, the population had 26.3% under the age of 18, 8.1% from 18 to 24, 28.2% from 25 to 44, 20.8% from 45 to 64, and 16.5% who were 65 years of age or older. The median age was 37 years. For every 100 females, there were 93.3 males. For every 100 females age 18 and over, there were 90.1 males.

The median income for a household in the city was $38,236, and the median income for a family was $45,703. Males had a median income of $32,308 versus $21,906 for females. The per capita income for the city was $18,529. About 5.1% of families and 7.9% of the population were below the poverty line, including 9.7% of those under age 18 and 5.6% of those age 65 or over.

Area attractions

Kansas Sports Museum
Harvey County Historical Society Library and Museum
Kauffman Museum
Warkentin House, a Victorian house museum.
Mennonite Settler statue
Blue Sky Sculpture
Sand Creek Nature Trail
Carriage Factory Art Gallery
Sand Creek Station Golf Course, 18-hole public course, ranked among 2006's best new public courses in America by Golf Digest.

Education

Primary and secondary education
The community is served by Newton USD 373 public school district.  Students from North Newton and Walton attend middle and upper grades in Newton.  Newton public schools consist of:

 High school
 Newton High School.

 Intermediate schools
 Santa Fe 5/6 Center.
 Chisholm Middle School.

 Elementary
 Northridge Elementary.
 Slate Creek Elementary.
 South Breeze Elementary.
 Sunset Elementary.
 Walton Rural Life Center (in Walton).

 Early education 
 Cooper Early Education

Private
Newton has two K-8 private schools:
 St. Mary's Catholic School.
 Newton Bible Christian School.

College
 Bethel College is located nearby in the city of North Newton.
 Hutchinson Community College has a satellite campus at the Axtell Education Center, close to downtown.

Media

Print media
The Newton Kansan (GateHouse Media) serves Newton and the surrounding area as the daily local newspaper. It is not published on Sundays or Mondays. The Wichita Eagle is the major newspaper for the region. The Newton Now newspaper is also a newspaper based in Newton and covers some of Harvey County.

Radio
AM
KJRG-AM 950 kHz, Christian talk

FM
KKGQ-FM 92.3 MHz, ESPN Wichita 92.3, sports programming
KBCU-FM 88.1 MHz - Bethel College (Kansas) - College events and Jazz music

Television
Newton is served by over-the-air ATSC digital TV of the Wichita-Hutchinson viewing market area, cable TV by Cox Communications, and satellite TV.  See Media in Wichita, Kansas.

Infrastructure

Transportation

BNSF Railway passes through Newton for transportation and shipping. Amtrak's Southwest Chief stops in Newton twice each day and provides passenger rail service towards Los Angeles and Chicago. The Amtrak station is located at 414 N Main St.

Bus service is provided daily towards Wichita and Salina by BeeLine Express (subcontractor of Greyhound Lines).

Major roads that pass through Newton are I-135, US-50, US-81, K-15.

Newton City/County Airport, FAA:EWK, is located 2 miles east of Newton.  Its  runway is one of only 11 runways in Kansas  or longer.  It has ILS and GPS approach.

Utilities
 Internet
 Cable is provided by Cox Communications.
 DSL is provided by AT&T.
 Wireless is provided by Pixius Communications.
 Satellite is provided by HughesNet, StarBand, WildBlue.
 TV
 Cable is provided by Cox Communications.
 Satellite is provided by DirecTV, Dish Network.
 Terrestrial is provided by regional digital TV stations.
 Telephone 
 Landline is provided by AT&T.
 Cellular is provided by Verizon Wireless, Sprint, and AT&T Mobility.
 Electricity
 City is provided by Westar Energy.
 Gas is provided by Kansas Gas Service.
 Water
 City is provided by City of Newton.
 Rural is provided by Harvey County RWD #1.
 Sewer is billed by City of Newton.
 Trash is billed by City of Newton.

Notable people
See also List of people from Harvey County, Kansas
 Tom Adair (1913–1988), screenwriter, musician, and composer
 Donna Atwood (1925–2010), figure skater and Ice Capades star
 Errett Bishop (1928–1983), mathematician, college professor.
 Tony Clark (born 1972), MLB first baseman and union executive
 Reed Crandall (1917-1982), illustrator and penciller of comic books and magazines, inducted into Will Eisner Comic Book Hall of Fame in 2009.
 James Earp (1841-1926), brother of Wyatt Earp and Virgil Earp
 Harold Foster (1906–1996), head coach of Wisconsin Badgers men's basketball team, member of Naismith Memorial Basketball Hall of Fame
 Orville Harrold, opera singer
 Elizabeth Hoisington (1918–2007), United States Army officer, one of two women to first attain the rank of Brigadier General
 John Houston (1890–1975), politician and Mayor of Newton
 John Janzen (born 1937), professor of anthropology and author
 Miles Johns (1994-), Mixed martial artist currently competing the UFC's bantam weight division. 
 John Keeny (1860–1939), president of Louisiana Tech University (1908–26), operated a mercantile store in Newton in 1886
 Samuel Peters (1842–1910), Captain in Union Army (1861-1865), Kansas State Senate (1874-1875), Judge of 9th District (1875-1883), U.S. House of Representatives (1883-1891), editor of Newton Daily Kansas-Republican (1899), postmaster in Newton (1898-1910), lawyer in Newton and Marion.
 Dustin Richardson (born 1984), MLB pitcher
 Jacob Schowalter (1879–1953), philanthropist, founder of Schowalter Foundation, Kansas State Representative.
 Jesse Unruh (1922–1987), California politician
 Mike Wellman (born 1956), NFL center
 Dallas Wiebe (1930-2009), writer
 John Yoder (1951–2017), Kansas and West Virginia state court judge, West Virginia State Senator

See also
 Newton High School
 Abilene Trail
 Chisholm Trail
 Gunfight at Hide Park
 Billy Bailey
 Mike McCluskie
 National Register of Historic Places listings in Harvey County, Kansas
 Carnegie Library
 Mennonite Settler statue
 Newton Stadium
 Santa Fe Depot
 Warkentin House
 La Junta Subdivision, branch of the BNSF Railway
 Arkansas Valley Interurban Railway

References

Further reading

 Bernhard Warkentin and the Kansas Mennonite Pioneers; David A. Haury; Mennonite Life; December 1974.

External links

 
City
 
 Newton - Directory of Public Officials, League of Kansas Municipalities
 Newton Area Chamber of Commerce & Visitors Bureau
Historical
 Harvey County Historical Museum
 Historic Images of Newton, Special Photo Collections at Wichita State University Library
Maps
 Newton City Map, KDOT
 Topo Map of Newton / North Newton / Walton area, USGS
 Harvey County Maps: Current, Historic, KDOT

Cities in Kansas
County seats in Kansas
Cities in Harvey County, Kansas
Wichita, KS Metropolitan Statistical Area
Populated places established in 1871
1871 establishments in Kansas